Giulia Doesn't Date at Night is a 2009 Italian drama film directed by Giuseppe Piccioni and starring Valerio Mastandrea as Guido and Valeria Golino as the title character, Giulia. It was shot in Rome during the summer of 2008 under its working title "Il premio". The film won the Nastro d'Argento for best original song (the song "Piangi Roma" by Baustelle).

Cast 
 Valerio Mastandrea: Guido
 Valeria Golino: Giulia
 Sonia Bergamasco: Benedetta
 Lidia Vitale: Female Agent
 Chiara Nicola: Viola
 Paolo Sassanelli: Bruno
 Antonia Liskova: Eva
 Domiziana Cardinali: Costanza
 Jacopo Domenicucci: Filippo
 Piera Degli Esposti: Attilia

References

External links 
 

2009 films
2000s Italian-language films
2009 drama films
Films about suicide
Films directed by Giuseppe Piccioni
Italian drama films
2000s Italian films